

Track listing
 Delirium - 3:31
 One Wish Away - 4:09
 If There is No Tomorrow - 4:27
 Vendetta - 4:29
 Out of the Ashes - 4:20
 Envy - 4:15
 Mirror - 4:20
 Anthem - 4:48
 The End of the Scene - 4:32
 Hide and Seek - 5:40
Total length: 44:30

2010 albums